The 1984 Centennial Cup is the 14th Junior "A" 1984 ice hockey National Championship for the Canadian Junior A Hockey League.

The Centennial Cup was competed for by the winners of the Abbott Cup/Western Canadian Champions and the Eastern Canadian Jr. A  Champions.  The Maritimes champions did not compete for the Eastern championship.

The finals were hosted by the Weyburn Red Wings in the city of Weyburn, Saskatchewan.

The Playoffs

Prior to the Regionals
Langley Eagles (BCJHL) defeated Prince George Spruce Kings (PCJHL) 2-games-to-none
Selkirk Steelers (MJHL) defeated Flin Flon Bombers (NMJHL) 4-games-to-1

MCC Finals

Regional Championships
Manitoba Centennial Cup: Weyburn Red Wings

Abbott Cup: Weyburn Red Wings
Eastern Champions: Orillia Terriers

Doyle Cup: Langley Eagles
Anavet Cup: Weyburn Red Wings
Dudley Hewitt Cup: Orillia Travelways
Callaghan Cup:

Roll of League Champions
AJHL: Fort Saskatchewan Traders
BCJHL: Langley Eagles
CJHL: Pembroke Lumber Kings
IJHL: Western Capitals
MJHL: Selkirk Steelers
MVJHL: Halifax Lions
NMJHL: Flin Flon Bombers
NOJHL: Rayside-Balfour Canadians
OJHL: Orillia Travelways
PCJHL: Prince George Spruce Kings
SJHL: Weyburn Red Wings

Awards
Most Valuable Player: Ron Amyotte (Weyburn Red Wings)
Most Sportsmanlike Player: Ron Amyotte (Weyburn Red Wings)

See also
Canadian Junior A Hockey League
Royal Bank Cup
Anavet Cup
Doyle Cup
Dudley Hewitt Cup
Fred Page Cup
Abbott Cup
Mowat Cup

External links
Royal Bank Cup Website

1984
Ice hockey competitions in Saskatchewan
Cup
Weyburn